Heterosilpha ramosa, the garden carrion beetle, is a species of carrion beetle in the family Silphidae. It is found in Central America and North America.

References

Further reading

 

Silphidae
Articles created by Qbugbot
Beetles described in 1823